Igan (known in Malay as ) is a village and a subdistrict in Matu District, Mukah Division, Sarawak, Malaysia. It is situated near the mouth of Igan River with the South China Sea. Igan is a type of fish that can only find around the village.

Igan has a primary school, namely Kampung Igan National School.

References

Matu District
Villages in Sarawak